Brice Roger (born 9 August 1990) is a World Cup alpine ski racer from France. From Bourg-Saint-Maurice, Savoie, he specializes in the speed events of downhill and super-G. He made his World Cup debut at age twenty in January 2011.

Roger was scheduled to compete for France at the 2014 Winter Olympics, but tore his anterior cruciate ligament during training and did not compete. He made the team for the 2018 Games and was eighth in the downhill.

World Cup results

Season standings

Results per discipline

Standings through 27 January 2019

Race podiums

 2 podiums – (2 SG)

World Championship results

Olympic results

References

External links

Brice Roger World Cup standings at the International Ski Federation

French Ski Team – 2018 men's A team – 
Rossignol.com – Brice Roger – alpine skiing – France

1990 births
Living people
Olympic alpine skiers of France
Alpine skiers at the 2018 Winter Olympics
French male alpine skiers
Université Savoie-Mont Blanc alumni
People from Bourg-Saint-Maurice
Sportspeople from Savoie
21st-century French people